The year 2016 is the 6th year in the history of the Fight Nights Global, a mixed martial arts promotion based in Russia. It started broadcasting through a television agreement with  Match TV.

List of events

Fight Nights Global 44: Machaev vs. Sarnavskiy

Fight Nights Global 44: Machaev vs. Sarnavskiy was a mixed martial arts event held by Fight Nights Global on February 26, 2016 at the Luzhniki Palace of Sports in Moscow, Russia.

Results

Fight Nights Global 45: Galiev vs. Stepanyan

Fight Nights Global 45: Galiev vs. Stepanyan was a mixed martial arts event held by Fight Nights Global on April 22, 2016 at the Ufa Arena in Ufa, Russia.

Results

Fight Nights Global 46: Mokhnatkin  vs. Kudin

Fight Nights Global 46: Mokhnatkin  vs. Kudin was a mixed martial arts event held by Fight Nights Global on April 29, 2016 at the Ice Palace Krylatskoye in Moscow, Russia.

Results

Fight Nights Global 47: Tyurin vs. Magal

Fight Nights Global 47: Tyurin vs. Magal was a mixed martial arts event held by Fight Nights Global on May 15, 2016 at the A2 Arena in Saint Petersburg, Russia.

Results

Fight Nights Global 48: Enomoto vs. Molodtsov

Fight Nights Global 48: Enomoto vs. Molodtsov was a mixed martial arts event held by Fight Nights Global on May 26, 2016 at the Luzhniki Palace of Sports in Moscow, Russia.

Results

Fight Nights Global 49: Stoyan vs. Škondrič

Fight Nights Global 49: Stoyan vs. Škondrič was a mixed martial arts event held by Fight Nights Global on June 4, 2016 at the Banská Bystrica Ice Stadium in Banská Bystrica, Slovakia.

Results

Fight Nights Global 50: Fedor vs. Maldonado

Fight Nights Global 50: Fedor vs. Maldonado was a mixed martial arts event held by Fight Nights Global on June 17, 2016 at the Sibur Arena in Saint Petersburg, Russia.

Results

Fight Nights Global: Summer Cup 2016

Fight Nights Global: Summer Cup 2016 was a mixed martial arts event held by Fight Nights Global on August 27, 2016 at the Black Sea Arena in Ureki, Georgia.

Results

Fight Nights Global 51: Pavlovich vs. Gelegaev

Fight Nights Global 51: Pavlovich vs. Gelegaev was a mixed martial arts event held by Fight Nights Global on September 25, 2016 at the Ali Aliev Sports Palace in Kaspiysk, Russia.

Results

Fight Nights Global 52: Mokhnatkin vs. Maldonado

Fight Nights Global 52: Mokhnatkin vs. Maldonado was a mixed martial arts event held by Fight Nights Global on October 1, 2016 at the Yubileyny Sports Palace in Nizhnevartovsk, Russia.

Results

Fight Nights Global 53: Day 1 - Gimbatov vs. Shokalo

Fight Nights Global 53: Day 1 - Gimbatov vs. Shokalo was a mixed martial arts event held by Fight Nights Global on October 7, 2016 at the Luzhniki Palace of Sports in Moscow, Russia.

Results

Fight Nights Global 53: Day 2 - Mineev vs. Enomoto

Fight Nights Global 53: Day 2 - Mineev vs. Enomoto was a mixed martial arts event held by Fight Nights Global on October 8, 2016 at the Luzhniki Palace of Sports in Moscow, Russia.

Results

Fight Nights Global 54: Pavlovich vs. Kudin

Fight Nights Global 54: Pavlovich vs. Kudin was a mixed martial arts event held by Fight Nights Global on November 16, 2016 at the KSK Express in Rostov-on-Don, Russia.

Results

Fight Nights Global 55: McGann vs. Egorov

Fight Nights Global 55: McGann vs. Egorov was a mixed martial arts event held by Fight Nights Global on November 22, 2016 at the Crocus City Hall in Moscow, Russia.

Results

Fight Nights Global 56: Falcão vs.  Mineev

Fight Nights Global 56: Falcão vs.  Mineev was a mixed martial arts event held by Fight Nights Global on December 9, 2016 at the Fetisov Arena in Vladivostok, Russia.

Results

Fight Nights Global Lightweight Grand-Prix bracket

Fight Nights Global 57: Sidelnikov vs. Agaev

Fight Nights Global 57: Sidelnikov vs. Agaev was a mixed martial arts event held by Fight Nights Global on December 1, 2016 at the Krylatskoye Sports Palace in Moscow, Russia

Results

References

Fight Nights Global events
2016 in mixed martial arts
AMC Fight Nights